Nowy Bud  German: Neubude, is a village in the administrative district of Gmina Strzeleczki, within Krapkowice County, Opole Voivodeship in south-western Poland.

References

Nowy Bud